Earth Is Room Enough is a collection of fifteen short science fiction and fantasy stories and two pieces of comic verse by American writer Isaac Asimov, published in 1957.  In his autobiography In Joy Still Felt, Asimov wrote, "I was still thinking of the remarks of reviewers such as George O. Smith... concerning my penchant for wandering over the Galaxy.  I therefore picked stories that took place on Earth and called the book Earth Is Room Enough."  The collection includes one story from the Robot series and four stories that feature or mention the fictional computer Multivac.

Contents

"The Dead Past" (1956), novelette, a Multivac story
"The Foundation of S.F. Success" (1954), poem
"Franchise" (1955), a Multivac story
"Gimmicks Three" (1956)
"Kid Stuff" (1953)
"The Watery Place" (1956)
"Living Space" (1956)
"The Message" (1955)
"Satisfaction Guaranteed" (1951), a Susan Calvin robot story
"Hell-Fire" (1956)
"The Last Trump" (1955)
"The Fun They Had" (1951)
"Jokester" (1956), a Multivac story
"The Immortal Bard" (1953)
"Someday" (1956), a Robots and Multivac story
"The Author's Ordeal" (1957), poem
"Dreaming Is a Private Thing" (1955)

References

Sources

External links
Earth is Room Enough at the Internet Speculative Fiction Database

1957 short story collections
Science fiction short story collections by Isaac Asimov
Doubleday (publisher) books